The 1989–90 season was Burnley's fifth season in the fourth tier of English football. They were managed by Frank Casper in his first full season in charge.

Appearances and goals

|}

Matches

Football League Division Four
Key

In Result column, Burnley's score shown first
H = Home match
A = Away match

pen. = Penalty kick
o.g. = Own goal

Results

Final league position

FA Cup

League Cup

Football League Trophy

References

1989-90
Burnley